The Claughton–Wright House is a historic house in rural Northumberland County, Virginia.  It is located near Lewisetta, 2 mi. northeast of the junction of VA 623 and VA 624, on Wright's Cove, a tributary of Glebe Creek.  The small wood-frame house was built in 1787 by William Claughton, a major landowner in the area.  The
house is a rare example of a period house in tidewater Virginia.  The building was restored in 2009.

The house was listed on the National Register of Historic Places in 1997.

See also
National Register of Historic Places listings in Northumberland County, Virginia

References

Houses on the National Register of Historic Places in Virginia
Federal architecture in Virginia
Houses completed in 1787
Northumberland County, Virginia
1787 establishments in Virginia
National Register of Historic Places in Northumberland County, Virginia